Greg Chambers (born November 14, 1982 in Toronto, Ontario) is a British/Canadian ice hockey right winger who played for the Basingstoke Bison.

Chambers played junior hockey in the Ontario Hockey League with the Peterborough Petes where he led the Petes in Scoring before playing one playoff game for the Missouri River Otters of the United Hockey League.  He played one season in the ECHL for the Pensacola Ice Pilots before moving to Italy to play for Varese.

Chambers joined Basingstoke in 2005 and became a fan-favourite with the club. In 2007-08, Chambers led the team in goals (39), assists (56) and points (95).

Chambers joined Coventry Blaze in April 2009, after Basingstoke dropped to the English Premier League.

External links

1982 births
HC Varese players
Basingstoke Bison players
Canadian ice hockey right wingers
British ice hockey right wingers
Coventry Blaze players
Living people
Missouri River Otters players
Pensacola Ice Pilots players
Ice hockey people from Toronto
Peterborough Petes (ice hockey) players
Serie A (ice hockey) players
Canadian expatriate ice hockey players in England
Canadian expatriate ice hockey players in Italy
Naturalised citizens of the United Kingdom
Naturalised sports competitors